Poruvazhy  is a village in Kollam district in the state of Kerala, India. The Poruvazhy Peruviruthy Malanada Temple is in the village.

Demographics
 India census, Poruvazhy had a population of 27,689 with 13,466 males and 14,223 females.

References

Villages in Kollam district